George John Charles Mercer Nairne Petty-Fitzmaurice, 8th Marquess of Lansdowne, DL (27 November 1912 – 25 August 1999), was a British peer and Conservative politician.

Background
Petty-Fitzmaurice was the only son of Lord Charles Mercer Nairne, the second son of Henry Petty-FitzMaurice, 5th Marquess of Lansdowne. His father was killed in action in 1914 while on active service in the First World War, and his mother, the former Lady Violet Elliot-Murray-Kynynmound, later married secondly  John Jacob Astor, 1st Baron Astor of Hever.

He was educated at Eton and Christ Church, Oxford, and served in the British Army in the Second World War.

In August 1944, Petty-Fitzmaurice’s life was significantly changed when his cousins the 7th Marquess of Lansdowne and his younger brother were both killed in action in the War. As a result, he suddenly and unexpectedly inherited the family peerages and estates, except for the Lordship of Nairne, which under Scottish law went to the 7th Marquess's sister Katherine Evelyn Constance Bigham (1912–1995).

Career
Lansdowne became a Justice of the Peace for Perthshire in 1950 and a Deputy Lieutenant of Wiltshire in 1952. In 1957 and 1958 he was a Lord-in-Waiting (government whip) and then was Parliamentary Under-Secretary of State at the Foreign Office between 1958 and 1962 and Minister of State for Commonwealth and Colonial Affairs between 1962 and 1964. Effectively his political career was ended by the election of the Labour government of 1964–1970. In 1964 he was appointed as a Privy Counsellor.

Personal life
Lansdowne was married four times.

On 18 March 1938 he married firstly Barbara Dempsey Chase (1918–1965), only child of Harold Stuart Chase (1890–1970), a real-estate investor of Santa Barbara, California, and Detroit, Michigan, and his wife, née Gertrude Boyer.  The first Lady Lansdowne died on 18 February 1965, from injuries sustained in a shotgun blast in the gunroom at her Scottish home, Meikleour House, found by the police to be an accident. They had four children:
 Lady Caroline Margaret Petty-Fitzmaurice (1939–1956); she, like her mother, died in a shooting accident.
 Charles Maurice Petty-Fitzmaurice (born 1941); later 9th Marquess of Lansdowne.
 Lord Robert Harold Mercer Nairne (born 1947); married Jane Elizabeth Gordon (born 1950), a cousin of Granville Gordon, 13th Marquess of Huntly, and had issue, two sons and one daughter. He is a writer who lives in Scotland on the Mercer-Nairne estates, inherited from his ancestress Emily Jane de Flahaut, 8th Lady Nairne. He has two sons and one daughter:
 Emily Jane Mercer Nairne (born 1974); married Dominic Robertson, has three daughters.
 Samuel George Mercer Nairne (born 1976); married Claire Aussudre, and has two sons (born 2009 and 2011) and one daughter.
 Joseph Douglas Mercer Nairne (born 1980); married Melissa Wakeley, and has one son and one daughter.
 Lady Georgina Elizabeth Petty-Fitzmaurice (1950–2022); married Guy Hamilton in 1974 (divorced 1980), and married Robert Eric Miller in 1981 (divorced 1991). She lived in London and had two children and three grandchildren.
 Josiah Stirling Hamilton (born 1975); married Justine Miller and lives in Santa Barbara, California - has one son and one daughter.
 Emma Carissa Hamilton (born 1977); married David Malina and lives in New York City - has one daughter.

On 22 December 1969, Lansdowne married, secondly, Selina Polly Dawson Carnegie, a daughter of David Eccles, 1st Viscount Eccles, and former wife of Robin Andrew Duthac Carnegie, becoming the stepfather of Andrew James Carnegie (born 1963). This marriage ended in divorce in 1978.

On 15 October 1978 Lansdowne married thirdly Gillian Anna Morgan (1936–1982), daughter of Alured A.E. Morgan and his first wife, the former Nancye Little-Jones.

On 12 July 1995, Lansdowne married fourthly Penelope Eve Astor (died 2006), widow of his half-brother John Astor, a former wife of David Rolt, and daughter of Commander George Francis Norton Bradford.

References

Links
George, 8th Marquess of Lansdowne profile, thepeerage.com; Retrieved 1 June 2009.
Jane Gordon, now Lady Robert Mercer Nairne profile, thepeerage.com; Retrieved 1 June 2009.

External links

1912 births
1999 deaths
British Army personnel of World War II
British Army soldiers
Conservative Party (UK) Baronesses- and Lords-in-Waiting
Deputy Lieutenants of Wiltshire
Earls of Kerry
8
Members of the Privy Council of the United Kingdom
Ministers in the Macmillan and Douglas-Home governments, 1957–1964